Awheaturris lozoueti is a species of sea snail, a marine gastropod mollusk in the family Raphitomidae.

Description
The length of the shell attains  5.8 mm.

Distribution
This marine species occurs off the Philippines.

References

External links
 Morassi, M.; Bonfitto, A. (2013). Three new bathyal raphitomine gastropods (Mollusca: Conoidea) from the Indo-Pacific region. Zootaxa. 3620(4)
 Gastropods.com: Awheaturris lozoueti

lozoueti
Gastropods described in 2013